Flagg is a civil parish in the Derbyshire Dales district of Derbyshire, England. The parish contains four listed buildings that are recorded in the National Heritage List for England. Of these, two are listed at Grade II*, the middle of the three grades, and the others are at Grade II, the lowest grade.  The parish contains the village of Flagg and the surrounding area, and the listed buildings consist of two farmhouses and associated structures.


Key

Buildings

References

Citations

Sources

 

Lists of listed buildings in Derbyshire